The 2019 Korea Open (also known as the 2019 KEB Hana Bank Korea Open for sponsorship purposes) was a professional women's tennis tournament played on outdoor hard courts. It was the 16th edition of the tournament, and part of the 2019 WTA Tour. It took place in Seoul, South Korea between 16 and 22 September 2019.

Points and prize money

Point distribution

Prize money

* per team

Singles main-draw entrants

Seeds 

 1 Rankings are as of September 9, 2019

Other entrants 
The following players received wildcards into the singles main draw:
  Kristie Ahn
  Choi Ji-hee 
  Han Na-lae

The following player received entry using a protected ranking into the singles main draw:
  Denisa Allertová

The following player received entry as a special exempt into the singles main draw:
  Mihaela Buzărnescu

The following players received entry from the qualifying draw:
  Tímea Babos
  Ana Bogdan 
  Priscilla Hon 
  Danielle Lao
  Greet Minnen
  Patricia Maria Țig

The following player received entry into the main draw as a lucky loser:
  Danka Kovinić

Withdrawals 
  Daria Gavrilova → replaced by  Kirsten Flipkens
  Ivana Jorović → replaced by  Stefanie Vögele
  Viktória Kužmová → replaced by  Denisa Allertová
  Maria Sakkari → replaced by  Danka Kovinić

Doubles main-draw entrants

Seeds 

1 Rankings are as of September 9, 2019

Other entrants 
The following pairs received wildcards into the doubles main draw:
  Jang Su-jeong /  Kim Na-ri
  Kim Da-bin /  Park So-hyun

Withdrawals 
Before the tournament
  Anastasia Potapova (right ankle injury)

During the tournament
  Karolína Plíšková (right thigh injury)

Champions

Singles 

  Karolína Muchová def.  Magda Linette, 6–1, 6–1

Doubles 

  Lara Arruabarrena /  Tatjana Maria def.  Hayley Carter /  Luisa Stefani, 7–6(9–7), 3–6, [10–7]

References

External links